Khezel-e Gharbi Rural District is a rural district (dehestan) in the Central District of Kangavar County, Kermanshah Province, Iran. At the 2006 census, its population was 4,987, in 1,172 families. The rural district has 24 villages.

References 

Rural Districts of Kermanshah Province
Kangavar County